Linkins Lake is an alpine lake in Pitkin County, Colorado, United States, located high in the Sawatch Range in the Hunter-Fryingpan Wilderness of White River National Forest.  The lake is accessible via a  trail from State Highway 82 west of Independence Pass.

References

Lakes of Colorado
Lakes of Pitkin County, Colorado
Glacial lakes of the United States